Harless is a surname. Notable people with the surname include: 

Gottlieb Christoph Adolf von Harless
Gottlieb Christoph Harless
James H. Harless (1919–2014), American business executive
Meredith Howard Harless
Patricia Harless, member of the Texas House of Representatives from Harris County
Richard F. Harless 
William G. Harless